A diagonal argument, in mathematics, is a technique employed in the proofs of the following theorems:

Cantor's diagonal argument (the earliest)
Cantor's theorem
Russell's paradox
Diagonal lemma
Gödel's first incompleteness theorem
Tarski's undefinability theorem
Halting problem
Kleene's recursion theorem

See also
 Diagonalization (disambiguation)